"Succession (Main Title Theme)" is the theme music of HBO's satirical black comedy-drama television series Succession which plays during the title sequence. It was composed by Nicholas Britell in 2018 and was released by Milan Records and HBO on July 20, 2018. The theme was composed using piano tunes, layered with strings, brass, beats from the 808 (drum machine) and percussive sounds to blend classical and hip hop music. The title theme was critically acclaimed and became hailed as "one of the best television show themes" while also being referenced in popular cultures, with being included in memes, remixes and fan projects. A remixed version of this song by rapper Pusha T, was released on October 2019. At the 71st Primetime Creative Arts Emmy Awards the title theme won the award for Outstanding Original Main Title Theme Music.

Background 
For Britell, hip hop was a major influence in the show, especially in the opening sequence Kendall Roy (Jeremy Strong) listens to Beastie Boys' "An Open Letter to NYC" (2004) as he arrives the headquarters of his family business. He said, "I wanted to incorporate some oversized hip-hop beats… While I grew up as a classical pianist, when I was in college I was in a hip-hop band – I used to make like four beats a day. But I’ve never had the opportunity or canvas to explore these things on the scale that Succession enabled [...] When you put things together and realise it’s working, it’s almost like a physical or emotional response." Though, he composed the theme, it still needed approval from the showrunner Jesse Armstrong and executive producer Adam McKay, who agreed to use it in the sequence. The title theme has been used as out the foundation of the score, which is being broken into smaller pieces and heard throughout the show. Multiple versions of the track has been recorded with the same chords playing different ways, as different instruments have been used.

According to former film and television composer, and founder of Ample Music, Drew Silverstein, "the score subverts expectations and leaves it up to viewers to determine a scene’s mood or subtext. Unlike sit-coms with clear audio cues or Marvel movies with big, bombastic musical moments, the Succession score refrains from providing a meta-commentary. That also adds to the documentary-style realism of the show. It’s meant to draw you into the reality that exists. It’s relatable enough that we’re like, ‘Oh wow, that’s our world, not a Disney movie in some imaginary world.'"

Composition 
The main title theme was composed from the classical piano tune underneath a massive hip-hop beat. He further used strings, brass and low-end beats from the Roland TR-808 drum machine, while oddly dissonant percussive sounds were laid and woven through the theme and other cues of the score. The song starts with a downbeat that "creates a decisive beginning that dominoes into a pattern of optimising the downbeats as the bars recur through the score". It then progresses into C minor and to B major, creating a dissonant sound.

Music theorist and psychologist Stefanie Acevedo, discusses about the titular theme in an interaction to Time magazine, where she breaks down each explanation of the composition, as "the piano, played in a high register, adds a sense of urgency or tension. This main melody is in a minor key punctuated by dissonant chords; some of the piano keys are even struck out of sync, producing a 'messy' sound. The use of extreme registers on the piano—that’s the big contrast between the high and low notes—and Britell’s distortion of the bass line rock the foundation of the theme. There are also two string layers at play: a “low ostinato” pattern (a repetitive musical phrase) gives the theme forward momentum, coupled with high strings that echo the piano motif with a 'very raw, shrill, almost out-of-control tone'."

Reception

Critical response 
The Succession title theme was hailed by mainstream critics, even referring to one of "the best title themes for television". Calling it as an "unmistakable earworm" and "trippy tune", Firstpost-based critic Lakshmi Govindrajan Javeri said that the tune is "both rich in its dark classical sound from the 1700s, yet groovy like Coolio was composing it on a Steinway". Rolling Stone-listed it in number 25, in one of their "Top 100 television theme songs of all time" and said "the music for Succession nicely drives home the notion of a ruling class that has descended into gangster decadence, of ambition and entitlement collapsing into chaos and nihilism".

Themes 
The combination of dark classical music and hip hop underlines a "kind of duality that is representative of the show’s themes", as Javeri had recalled, that "on the one hand, there are outrageous heights of luxury and obscene exploitation of power, the other hand holds within the quirks of humane vulnerability that hides behind the absurdity of one’s misplaced sense of self. It is cyclical in its very nature because every oppressor operates from a space of fearing victimhood, and every victim in the show has a false, egoistic perception of how they have perhaps scored a home run in manipulation. There is neither clarity of morals nor vision, and the title theme heightens this obfuscation with striking distortion effects."

Personnel 

 Nicholas Britell – score producer
 John Finklea – score producer
 Patricia Sullivan – mastering
 Tommy Vicari – mixing
 Stefan Karrer – executive producer
 Jean-Christophe Chamboredon – executive producer
 Pablo Manyer – production manager

Remixed version 

The title theme was remixed several times by fans of the show, as the song reached popularity. However, Britell wanted the song to be officially remixed, hence he chose Pusha T to produce the remix version, as he felt that "his voice is like a missile". Pusha met Britell at a recording in Los Angeles, who was pitched the track and said about the series' theme: "We talked about the connection to power and its dynamic, issues writ large: struggle, pain, all of the things we could deal with". He had to redo the lyrics, as it might reveal the plot details for the second season as "the lines were too detailed". For the remix, he used more bass and hip hop to create "more bigger and bolder sound", while also adding choral arrangements to the sound.

The track was released as "Puppets (Succession Remix)" as a single on October 4, 2019 by HBO and Def Jam Recordings.

References 

2018 songs
Television drama theme songs
2018 compositions